Toli Masjid (1671 AD),  also known as Damri Masjid, is a mosque in Karwan, Hyderabad, India. It is 2 km from the Golconda fort on the way to Charminar. Built by Mir Musa Khan Mahaldar during the reign of Abdullah Qutb Shah in (1082 AH). This mosque is INTACH awarded and a declared heritage site by Archaeological Survey of India. On scale of architecture Toli Mosque ranks next after Mecca Masjid, Hyderabad, India.

History
Built by Mir Musa Khan Mahaldar in 1671 AD during the rule of Sultan Abdullah Qutub Shah, it is one of the finest examples of Qutub Shahi architecture. He used architect Mecca Masjid of Hyderabad and royal architect of Sultan Abdullah Qutub Shah.

There is a chapter in the royal records called the "Gulzar-e-Asafia." It mentions that when the royal architect was building Mecca Masjid, he was given one damri/damdi (coin) out of every rupee spent on it. The sum of money thus collected was used by Musa Khan to construct the Toli Masjid. Hence, this masjid is also called Damri Masjid.

Architecture

The mosque is built on a raised platform with a high plinth, divided into two halls, the outer one having five-arched openings, among five outer arches the central arch is the largest and most decorated. The central arch is a bit wider and more ornate than the remaining four.

The inscription in the prayer hall reveals that Musa Khan (who played an important role in the accession of the last Qutb Shahi Sultan, Abul Hasan Qutb Shah to the throne of Golconda) built the mosque. The Musa Burj (bastion) of the Golconda fort is also his work.

Deterioration
According to The Hindu, the land around the Toli Masjid had been encroached by the local residents under political influence, and due to pollution and lack of maintenance the mosque minarets are losing its carved beauty.

Gallery

See also
Golconda Fort
Spanish Mosque, Hyderabad
Islamic Heritage of Hyderabad

References

Mosques in Hyderabad, India
Tourist attractions in Hyderabad, India
Heritage structures in Hyderabad, India
Hyderabad State
1671 establishments in India
Religious buildings and structures completed in 1671
Qutb Shahi architecture